Tegirmen-Say is a village in Jalal-Abad Region of Kyrgyzstan. It is part of the Aksy District. Its population was 631 in 2021.

References

Populated places in Jalal-Abad Region